Neethiyin Marupakkam is a 1985 Tamil-language action drama film directed by S. A. Chandrasekhar and produced by Shoba Chandrasekhar. The film stars Vijayakanth, Raadhika, Vadivukkarasi and V. K. Ramasamy. It was released on 27 September 1985.

Plot

Cast 

Vijayakanth as Vijayakumar
Raadhika
Anuradha
Vadivukkarasi
V. K. Ramasamy
Senthil
Y. Vijaya
Senthamarai
Radha Ravi
Jaishankar
Vinu Chakravarthy
Major Sundarrajan
Thideer Kannaiah
S. A. Chandrasekhar

Soundtrack 
The music was composed by Ilaiyaraaja. The lyrics for the songs were penned by Pulamaipithan, Mu. Metha, Vaali, Muthulingam, Gangai Amaran and Vairamuthu. The song "Naan Irukka Bayam Edarkku" is set in the Valaji raga.

Reception 
Jeyamanmadhan of Kalki criticised the film for being formulaic.

References

External links 
 

1980s action drama films
1980s Tamil-language films
1985 films
Films directed by S. A. Chandrasekhar
Films scored by Ilaiyaraaja
Indian action drama films